Blue Collar is the debut album by Grammy Award winning songwriter, Rhymefest. It was released July 11, 2006 on J Records, and includes the single "Brand New," which features Kanye West.

Track listing

Reception

Despite being a sleeper upon its release, the album was met with positive reviews. HipHopDX gave it 4 stars out of 5, while Pitchfork Media ranked it as high as 8.0/10.

Samples
Dynomite (Going Postal)
"We Will Always Be Together" by The Whatnauts
"The Black Prince Has Arrived" by Jimmie Walker
Brand New
"The Dap Dip" by Sharon Jones & The Dap-Kings
"Pick It Up, Lay It in the Cut" by Sharon Jones & The Dap-Kings
Fever
"Fever" by La Lupe
All I Do
"Ain't That (Mellow Mellow)" by Willie Hutch
Get Down
Unknown
Stick
"Take Me to the Mardi Gras" by Bob James
All Girls Cheat
"Think of Your Thoughts As Children" by Phillipe Wynn
"Footsteps in the Dark" by The Isley Brothers
Devil's Pie
"Someday" by The Strokes
Sister
"Intimate Friends" by Eddie Kendricks
Bullet
"Bullet and a Target" by Citizen Cope
Tell A Story
"You Don't Have to Be Alone" by The New Birth
Build Me Up
"Build Me Up Buttercup" by The Foundations

Album singles

Album chart positions

References

2006 debut albums
Albums produced by Mark Ronson
Albums produced by Kanye West
Albums produced by Just Blaze
Albums produced by No I.D.
Albums produced by Emile Haynie
J Records albums
Allido Records albums